A hybrid vehicle is a vehicle which uses a mixture of power or fuel sources.

Hybrid vehicle may also refer to:
 A high-performance European-designed and built sports or touring car with a powerful American V8 engine, typically from the 1950s to 1970s.
 Hybrid electric vehicle, increasingly common automobiles which employ both a traditional internal combustion engine and an electric battery motor/generator to provide motive force and energy recovery.
 Mild hybrid
 Full hybrid
 Plug-in hybrid, an electric hybrid vehicle that can be plugged into a power grid to recharge its battery.
 Hydraulic hybrid, a hybrid vehicle which employs both a traditional internal combustion engine and a hydraulic motor/pump to provide motive force and energy recovery. Currently developed for big trucks/buses that start/stop often. 
 Dual-mode vehicle, a hybrid vehicle which uses power from two sources of the same type
 Flexible-fuel vehicle, a hybrid vehicle which can use more than one type of liquid fuel for its internal combustion engine (commonly gasoline/LPG or gasoline/alcohol or gasoline/ethanol) The military has used gasoline/diesel/JP5 combos.
 Motorized bicycle, a bicycle powered by human and another power source such as liquid fuels or electricity
 Hybrid train, a locomotive with more than one power source
 Hybrid velomobile, an enclosed human-powered vehicle with an auxiliary (usually electric) motor